Bahsita Mosque, also known as Sita Mosque, is one of the historical mosques in Aleppo, Syria, dating back to the Mamluk period. It is located in al-Aqaba district of the Ancient City of Aleppo, near the Bab al-Faraj Clock Tower and the National Library of Aleppo. It was built in 1350. According to the Aleppine historian Sheikh Kamel al-Ghazzi, the name of the mosque is derived from the Syriac name of the neighbourhood Bet Hasiota or Bet Hasda, meaning the house of purity.

In 1911, the octagonal minaret of the mosque was moved to the eastern side of the building to allow enough space to widen the nearby street.

See also
 List of mosques in Syria

References

Mosques completed in 1350
Mamluk mosques in Syria
Mamluk architecture in Syria
Mosques in Aleppo
Mausoleums in Syria
14th-century mosques